Ron Stanton (1928−2012) was an Australian professional rugby league footballer who played in the 1950s. A Queensland representative halfback and a key member of the Brisbane Rugby League premiership-winning Eastern Suburbs side of 1950, he joined the New South Wales Rugby Football League's St. George club for one year in 1952. Towards the end of the season, Stanton suffered a career-ending leg injury and retired from playing. In 1953, he returned to Brisbane to coach the Souths Club at Gordonvale, Queensland.

References

Australian rugby league players
St. George Dragons players
Queensland rugby league team players
Eastern Suburbs Tigers players
Brisbane rugby league team players
1928 births
2012 deaths
Rugby league halfbacks
Rugby league players from Brisbane